Miss E... So Addictive is the third studio album by American rapper and singer Missy Elliott. It was released by The Goldmind Inc. and Elektra Records on May 15, 2001, in the United States. The album spawned the club and R&B/hip-hop hits "One Minute Man", featuring Ludacris and Trina, and "Get Ur Freak On", as well as the international club hit "4 My People" and the less commercially successful single "Take Away".

The album debuted at number two on the US Billboard 200 chart, selling 250,000 copies in its first week. The album was certified platinum by the Recording Industry Association of America (RIAA). The album garnered two Grammy Awards for "Get Ur Freak On" and the non-single "Scream a.k.a. Itchin'" for Best Rap Solo Performance and Best Female Rap Solo Performance respectively.

Critical reception

Miss E... So Addictive received widespread acclaim from music critics. On Metacritic, the album holds a score of 89 out of 100 based on 16 reviews, indicating "universal acclaim." John Bush from AllMusic felt that Elliott was "sounding more assured of her various strengths than at any time since her startling debut" and called "her best album so far." He wrote that it's "a tribute to her incredible songwriting skills and Timbaland's continuing production excellence that she can have it any way she wants it and still come away with a full-length that hangs together brilliantly." Rolling Stone found that Miss E... So Addictive "proclaims unto all the world that Missy (the singer-rapper-songwriter), along with Tim (the producer), is back on top, making the most sonically inventive, rhythmically explosive pop music around. La freak, c'est chic."

The Guardian critic Alexis Petridis found that the album "certainly sounds a little disorientated and spacey" and it "an intriguing album. Packed with unique ideas and brilliantly realised, Miss E... So Addictive is further evidence of Elliott's refusal to play male rappers at their own game and her desire to change the rules entirely. It's an album that sets its own agenda and sounds like nothing else in hip-hop: an incomparable achievement." David Browne from Entertainment Weekly noted that "Elliott spends too much time dissing detractors, but the hooks come as fast as the reefer references, and for the first time since her debut, she sounds as if she's having a blast singing, rhyming, growling, hissing, and purring." The New Yorker called Miss E... So Addictive a "foot-tapping, hip-shaking ride from start to finish. Elliott's long-term producer Timbaland refuses to pad the album with filler, instead making every song count, from the driving hip-hop numbers to the languorous ballads."

Year-end lists

Commercial performance
Miss E... So Addictive debuted at number two on the US Billboard 200 chart, selling 250,000 copies in its first week. This became Elliott's third US top ten debut. The album ended up spending a total of 43 weeks on the chart. On July 18, 2001, the album was certified platinum by the Recording Industry Association of America (RIAA) for sales of over a million copies in the United States. As of November 2015, the album has sold 1,767,000 copies in the US.

Track listing 
Credits adapted from the album's liner notes.

Notes
 signifies a co-producer
 signifies an additional producer

Sample credits
 "Whatcha Gon' Do" contains an uncredited sample of "Colonial Mentality" by Fela Kuti and the Afrika 70.

Charts

Weekly charts

Year-end charts

Certifications

References

External links
 

2001 albums
Albums produced by Craig Brockman
Albums produced by Missy Elliott
Albums produced by Timbaland
Missy Elliott albums
Elektra Records albums